Allen Kerr may refer to:
 Allen Kerr (biologist)
 Allen Kerr (cricketer)
 Allen Kerr (politician)